Marghzar (also Romanized as Marghzār, Morgh Zar, and Murgh Zār) is a village in Shusef Rural District, Shusef District, Nehbandan County, South Khorasan Province, Iran. At the 2006 census, its population was 56, in 13 families.

References 

Populated places in Nehbandan County